Doctor Who and the Pescatons (commonly shortened to The Pescatons) is an audio play in two episodes based on the long-running British science fiction television series Doctor Who. It is written by Victor Pemberton, and stars Tom Baker as the Fourth Doctor, Elisabeth Sladen as Sarah Jane Smith and Bill Mitchell as Zor.

Plot

Part 1

The Doctor and Sarah Jane arrive on a beach by the Thames Estuary at night, and discover a metallic seaweed there. The Doctor consults with Professor Emerson, who says that three expeditions to recover a recent meteorite from the bottom of the estuary have all vanished. The Doctor goes diving and is attacked by something that wraps itself around him, but then lets him go. The meteorite is really a wrecked spaceship buried under the estuary. The Doctor believes it is a Pescaton ship.  The Pescatons are carcharhinidae, or deep water sharks. The experts scoff at this, until one comes out of the Thames and makes its way to London Zoo in search of salt water. The Doctor confronts it in the Aquarium, where it dies and disintegrates.  That night, more meteorites land in the Thames.

Part 2

London is invaded. The Doctor recalls his visit to planet Pesca, where he fell down a chasm into a cavern and met Zor, the Pescaton leader. Zor said he would use the Doctor to find a new home; Pesca was drying out and falling towards its sun. Zor used his hypnotic powers on the Doctor, who fought back and escaped. Back in London, Sarah Jane finds an abandoned baby while the military shoot rounds at the invading Pescatons with no effect. The Doctor distracts a Pescaton by singing "Hello, Dolly!" and doing a dance so that Sarah Jane can get away with the child. Finally the Pescatons fall back to the salt water, except for one trapped in a London Underground tunnel. The Doctor and Sarah Jane search for it, and the Doctor plays a piccolo to calm his nerves. The Pescaton retreats at the sound. Professor Emerson helps the Doctor build a high frequency sound trap inside a sewer, and Zor is lured there to be destroyed as the planet Pesca disintegrates in its orbit. Without Zor to control it, the Pescaton invasion ends.

Releases

Doctor Who and the Pescatons was released on LP and cassette by Argo (a division of Decca) in July 1976, re-released on CD in 1991 by Silva Screen Records, and re-released again by BBC Audio on CD on 3 January 2005. The 2005 CD release includes the complete original programme on disc one, and a new interview with Elisabeth Sladen recorded on 21 May 2004 on disc two. 

It was re-released as an LP – this time on coloured vinyl and as part of a two-album Doctor Who release – by Demon Records on 22 April 2017 for Record Store Day.

In print

Doctor Who and the Pescatons was novelised in 1991 by Victor Pemberton as Doctor Who – The Pescatons and published by Target Books. Although not the final Target release (that would come in 1994 with The Paradise of Death), this was the final new release in Target's traditional format which had been in place since 1973; subsequent new releases would be longer and in a differently presented book format.

References

External links

Target novelisation

 On Target — The Pescatons

1976 audio plays
1991 British novels
1991 science fiction novels
Doctor Who audio plays novelised by Victor Pemberton
Fourth Doctor audio plays
Pescatons